Kila Pala (born 16 May 1986) is a Papua New Guinean cricket coach and former player. 

Pala played as a left-handed batsman who bowled left-arm medium pace and who occasionally fielded as a wicket-keeper. He made his Twenty20 International debut for Papua New Guinea against Ireland in the 2015 ICC World Twenty20 Qualifier tournament on 15 July 2015.

Having played age group cricket for Papua New Guinea Under-19s in the 2004 Under-19 World Cup, he proceeded to be selected as a part of the Papua New Guinea squad for the 2011 World Cricket League Division Three, where he played 5 matches, helping them earn promotion to 2011 World Cricket League Division Two.  It was in this competition that he made his List A debut against Namibia.  He played a further 2 List A matches in the competition, the against Hong Kong and Uganda.  In his 3 matches, he scored 50 runs at a batting average of 16.66, with a high score 22.

Coaching career
Pala was head coach of Papua New Guinea at the 2018 Under-19 Cricket World Cup in New Zealand.

References

External links
Kila Pala at ESPNcricinfo
Kila Pala at CricketArchive

1986 births
Living people
Papua New Guinean cricketers
Papua New Guinea Twenty20 International cricketers
Wicket-keepers